Evan Stoflet (born May 16, 1984) is an American professional ice hockey Defenseman who was most recently with Briançon in the Ligue Magnus. He previously iced in the UK EIHL with the Fife Flyers and Milton Keynes Lightning. He was previously with ASC Corona Brașov of the Erste Liga.

Undrafted, he formerly played for China Dragon, a Chinese team playing in Asia League Ice Hockey. After two seasons in China, Stoflet opted to return to North America, signing a one-year deal in a return to his first ECHL club, the Utah Grizzlies on August 29, 2016.

In the 2016–17 season, Stoflet in a defensive minded role contributed with 9 points in 45 games. At the conclusion of his contract with the Grizzlies, Stoflet returned to Europe in agreeing to a one-year deal with Romania club, ASC Corona Brașov of the Erste Liga on July 23, 2017.

After spending the second half of the 2017-18 season with EIHL side Milton Keynes Lightning, Stoflet then joined fellow Elite League side Fife Flyers in August 2018.

Stoflet spent the 2019-20 season in France with Briançon in the Ligue Magnus.

References

External links

1984 births
American men's ice hockey defensemen
Bakersfield Condors (1998–2015) players
China Dragon players
Copenhagen Hockey players
Corpus Christi Rayz players
Des Moines Buccaneers players
Esbjerg Energy players
Elmira Jackals (ECHL) players
Milton Keynes Lightning players
Fife Flyers players
Diables Rouges de Briançon players
Living people
Utah Grizzlies (ECHL) players
Vermont Catamounts men's ice hockey players
Ice hockey players from Wisconsin
American expatriate ice hockey players in Scotland
American expatriate ice hockey players in England
American expatriate ice hockey players in China
American expatriate ice hockey players in Denmark
American expatriate ice hockey players in Romania
American expatriate ice hockey players in France